Kajan (also Romanized as Kājān; also known as Kachan and Kadzhan) is a village in Khara Rud Rural District, in the Central District of Siahkal County, Gilan Province, Iran. At the 2006 census, its population was 234, in 74 families.

References 

Populated places in Siahkal County